Cameron Mitchell (born Cameron McDowell Mitzell; November 4, 1918 – July 6, 1994) was an American film, television, and stage actor. He began his career on Broadway before entering films in the 1950s, appearing in several major features. Late in his career, he  became known for his roles in numerous exploitation films in the 1970s and 1980s.

Mitchell began acting on Broadway in the late 1930s before signing a contract with Metro-Goldwyn-Mayer and appearing in such films as Cass Timberlane (1945) and Homecoming (1948). He subsequently originated the role of Happy Loman in the Broadway production of Arthur Miller's Death of a Salesman (1949), a role he reprised in the 1951 film adaptation. With 20th Century Fox, he appeared in How to Marry a Millionaire (1953).

Throughout the 1960s, he appeared in spaghetti Westerns and Italian films―including several collaborations with director Mario Bava―then on U.S. television. From the mid-1970s through the 1980s, he appeared in numerous exploitation and horror films and television shows.

Early life
Mitchell was born in Dallastown, Pennsylvania, of Scottish and German descent, one of seven children of Rev. Charles Michael Mitzell and Kathryn Isabella (née Ehrhart) Mitzell. Young Cameron moved to Chicora, Pennsylvania, in 1921 when his father was accepted as pastor of the St. John's Reformed Church, Butler, Pennsylvania, and grew up in Shrewsbury, Pennsylvania. He was a 1936 graduate of Greenwood High School in Millerstown, Pennsylvania.

Career

Stage work
In 1939, Mitchell made his Broadway debut in a minor role in Jeremiah. During this time, he became an NBC page at NBC Radio City, which led to a minor role in a 1940 production of The Taming of the Shrew with Alfred Lunt and Lynn Fontanne's National Theater Company.

In 1941, he appeared again on Broadway in The Trojan Women. In 1944, he served as a bombardier with the United States Army Air Forces during World War II.

Transition to film
Mitchell's film career began when he was contracted to Metro-Goldwyn-Mayer in 1945 for three years, with minor roles in films including They Were Expendable (1945), starring John Wayne and Robert Montgomery. He was featured with Lana Turner and Spencer Tracy in Cass Timberlane, and with Wallace Beery in The Mighty McGurk (both 1947). He concluded his MGM period with two films starring Clark Gable: Homecoming (also with Turner) and Command Decision (both 1948).

Mitchell originated the role of Happy Loman in Arthur Miller's Death of a Salesman (1949) on Broadway. After its closing, he appeared again in the Broadway production of Southern Exposure (1950). Mitchell reprised the role of Happy Loman in the 1951 film adaptation released by Columbia Pictures. Mitchell was contracted with 20th Century-Fox, where he had a prolific career in such films as a version of Les Miserables (1952) as Marius, and in the comedy How to Marry a Millionaire (1953), in which he portrayed a wealthy man attempting to romance a single woman (played by Lauren Bacall). Marilyn Monroe and Betty Grable were the other female leads.

He then appeared alongside Gary Cooper, Susan Hayward, and Richard Widmark in the drama Garden of Evil (1954), followed by a supporting role in Samuel Fuller's Cold War drama Hell and High Water (1954). He subsequently co-starred with Marlon Brando in Désirée (1954); with Gable and Jane Russell in the Western The Tall Men (1955); and the film version of the stage musical Carousel (1956). Mitchell was loaned back to MGM to co-star with Doris Day and James Cagney in the musical drama Love Me or Leave Me (1955).

Mitchell co-starred with Joanne Woodward and Sheree North in the drama No Down Payment (1957).

Television and exploitation films

Mitchell starred in an unsold 1959 television pilot called I Am a Lawyer, but he achieved success on television during the latter part of his career, where he is best remembered for starring as Buck Cannon in the 1960s/1970s NBC Western series, The High Chaparral. He had the lead as John Lackland in the 1961 syndicated adventure series The Beachcomber.

Throughout the 1960s, Mitchell starred in numerous Italian sword and sandal, horror, fantasy, and thriller films, several of which were directed by Mario Bava. Among his collaborations with Bava were the action film Erik the Conqueror (1961), playing a Viking; Blood and Black Lace (1964), in which he portrayed the owner of a fashion house plagued by a series of brutal murders;  and as a knife-throwing Viking warrior in Knives of the Avenger (1966). He also appeared in Westerns, such as Minnesota Clay (1964) and Ride in the Whirlwind (1966).

In later years, Mitchell appeared in villainous roles as a sheriff-turned-outlaw in Hombre (1967), a bandit in Buck and the Preacher (1972), and a Ku Klux Klan racist in The Klansman (1974). Beginning in 1970, he intermittently filmed The Other Side of the Wind with director Orson Welles, a project that was unreleased until 2018. In 1975–1976, he portrayed Jeremiah Worth in the Swiss Family Robinson TV series, and had a supporting role opposite Leo Fong in the Filipino film Enforcer from Death Row (1976).

Mitchell was subsequently  featured on an episode of Bonanza and ABC's S.W.A.T.. He guest-starred on the "Landslide" episode of Movin' On in 1975. He appeared on Gene Evans's short-lived Spencer's Pilots on CBS in 1976. Mitchell also had roles in horror films and in many exploitation films, such as The Toolbox Murders (1978), the creature feature The Swarm (1978), the slasher film The Demon (1979), the slasher film Silent Scream (1980). He appeared again on Broadway in the 1978 production of The November People, and the same year starred as Henry Gordon in the television miniseries adaptation of Black Beauty.

Later work
Late in his career, Mitchell played a gangster for laughs in My Favorite Year (1982), and a police detective in the 1983 pornographic film Dixie Ray, Hollywood Star. He had a supporting role in the anthology horror films Night Train to Terror (19V85) and From a Whisper to a Scream (1987), as well as roles portraying right-wing General Edwin A. Walker in Prince Jack (1985), and as Captain Alex Jansen in Space Mutiny, a 1988 South African science fiction film that appeared as an "Experiment" in episode 820 of Mystery Science Theater 3000.

In 1984, he had the role of Duke Kovak in Partners in Crime. He also appeared in an episode of Knight Rider (1982 TV series), playing the role of criminal, Bernie Mitchell.

Personal life
On August 17, 1940, Mitchell married Johanna Mendel in Lancaster, New Hampshire. The Mendel family was based in Saskatoon, Saskatchewan, where Fred Mendel founded Intercontinental Packers, a major family-owned meat packing operation. The Mitchells' four children held dual US/Canadian citizenship. Johanna Mitchell gave birth to their first son, Robert Cameron Mitchell. Although Mitchell and Johanna later divorced, he maintained close ties to Canada. Their daughter, Camille Mitchell, and another son, Charles (later known as Cameron Mitchell Jr.;); are both actors. Cameron and Johanna's second son, Michael Fredrick "Fred" Mitchell, was president of Intercontinental Packers for many years working alongside his mother, Johanna, who was chairwoman of the board. The company is now known as Mitchell's Gourmet Foods and still operates out of Saskatoon, now owned by Maple Leaf Foods. 

Mitchell married Lissa Jacobs Gertz in June 1957. His first wife, Johanna filed a lawsuit alleging cruelty, and sought over $2,000 a month in financial support. Mitchell and Gertz had three children: Kate, Jake, and Jono. 

In February 1974, Mitchell entered his second bankruptcy, with $2.4 million in debts contrasted against $26 in two bank accounts. He told Associated Press writer Bob Thomas: "The reasons are the same as have happened to other actors over the years. Stupid, bad investments. Parasites who live off you. Too much trust in people who handle your money."

On May 9, 1973, Mitchell married Margaret Brock Johnson Mozingo, whom he met when he was in Clemson, South Carolina, making The Midnight Man; their marriage took place in Puerto Rico. In November 1976, his wife applied to a civil court to annul the marriage on the grounds of bigamy. Arguing she was the victim of deception, she said she married her husband before his divorce from Gertz was finalized on February 23, 1974. Mitchell's marriage to Mozingo was formally annulled. In March 1976, Gertz had sued Mozingo for $53,000, a sum she claimed Mitchell and Mozingo agreed to pay her as a divorce settlement.

Mitchell died of lung cancer on July 6, 1994, in Pacific Palisades, California, at age 75. He is buried in Desert Memorial Park in Cathedral City, California.

Filmography

Notes

References

Sources

External links

 
 
 
 

1918 births
1994 deaths
20th-century American male actors
American male film actors
American male stage actors
American male television actors
American people of German descent
Burials at Desert Memorial Park
Deaths from lung cancer in California
Male Spaghetti Western actors
Male actors from Pennsylvania
People from Butler County, Pennsylvania
People from Dallastown, Pennsylvania
People from Perry County, Pennsylvania
United States Army Air Forces officers
United States Army Air Forces personnel of World War II
Western (genre) television actors
Military personnel from Pennsylvania